This is a list of Sint Maarten leaders of government, from 1631 to the present.

{| align="center" rules="all" cellspacing="0" cellpadding="4" style="border: 1px solid #999; border-right: 2px solid #999; border-bottom: 2px solid #999; background: #f3fff3;"
|+ style="font-weight: bold; font-size: 1.1em; margin-bottom: 0.5em"| Prime Ministers from 10 October 2010. '|-style="background:#ddffdd"
! Period !! Name
|-
|10 October 2010 - 19 December 2014||DP - Sarah Wescot-Williams (b. 1956)
|-
|19 December 2014 - 19 November 2015||UPP - Marcel Gumbs (b. 1953).
|-
|19 November 2015 - 24 November 2017 ||NA - William Marlin (b. 1950)
|-
|24 November 2017 - 15 January 2018 ||USP - Rafael Boasman (b. 1953)
|-
|15 January 2018 - 10 October 2019||UD - Leona Marlin-Romeo (b. 1973)
|-
|10 October 2019 - 19 November 2019||SMCP - Wycliffe Smith (b. 1948)
|-
|19 November 2019 - ||NA - Silveria Jacobs (b. 1968)
|-
|colspan="2" align="center" |  Party abbreviations: DP = Democratic Party; NA = National Alliance; SMCP = Sint Maarten Christian Party; UPP = United People's Party; UD = United Democrats; USP = United St. Maarten Party
|}

See also
 Saint Martin (island), the Caribbean island
 The French side of the island
 Culture of St. Martin, the Caribbean island
 History of St. Martin, the Caribbean island
 O sweet Saint-Martin's Land'' (bi-national song/anthem of Saint-Martin/Sint-Maarten )

References 

Politics of Sint Maarten